The 2020 NC State Wolfpack baseball team represented North Carolina State University during the 2020 NCAA Division I baseball season. The Wolfpack played their home games at Doak Field as a member of the Atlantic Coast Conference. They were led by head coach Elliott Avent, his 24th season at NC State. On March 12, 2020, due to the COVID-19 pandemic, NC State and the ACC announced the season will be suspended until further notice. On March 17, 2020, the Atlantic Coast Conference announced all spring sports would be cancelled for the remainder of the season.

Previous season
In 2019, the Wolfpack finished the season 2nd in the ACC's Atlantic Division with a record of 42–19, 18–12 in conference play. They qualified for the 2019 Atlantic Coast Conference baseball tournament, and were eliminated in the semifinals.

Personnel

Roster

Coaching staff

Schedule

! style="" | Regular Season
|- valign="top" 

|- bgcolor="#bbffbb"
| February 14 || * ||  || Doak Field • Raleigh, NC || W 4–0 || Swiney (1–0) || Stewart (0–1) || Klyman (1) || 2,702 || 1–0 || –
|- bgcolor="#bbffbb"
| February 15 || James Madison* ||  || Doak Field • Raleigh, NC || W 9–6 || Highfill (1–0) || Ayer (0–1) || Klyman (2) || 2,659 || 2–0 || –
|- bgcolor="#bbffbb"
| February 16 || James Madison* ||  || Doak Field • Raleigh, NC || W 11–2 || Feeney (1–0) || DeLauter (0–1) || None || 2,566 || 3–0 || –
|- bgcolor="#bbffbb"
| February 18 || * ||  || Doak Field • Raleigh, NC || W 6–1 || Harrison (1–0) || Williams (0–1) || None || 2,280 || 4–0 || –
|- bgcolor="#bbffbb"
| February 22 || * ||  || Doak Field • Raleigh, NC || W 8–2 || Swiney (2–0) || Hursey (0–1) || Nelson (1) || 2,347 || 5–0 || –
|- bgcolor="#bbffbb"
| February 22 || Tennessee Tech* ||  || Doak Field • Raleigh, NC || W 10–3 || Highfill (2–0) || Adams (0–1) || None || 2,347 || 6–0 || –
|- bgcolor="#bbffbb"
| February 23 || Tennessee Tech* ||  || Doak Field • Raleigh, NC || W 15–1 || Villaman (1–0) || Herberholz (0–1) || None || 2,560 || 7–0 || –
|- bgcolor="#bbffbb"
| February 25 || *  ||  || Doak Field • Raleigh, NC || W 11–0 || Willadsen (1–0) || Lawson (0–1) || None || 2,308 || 8–0 || –
|- bgcolor="#bbffbb"
| February 28 || vs. *  ||  || U.S. Bank Stadium • Minneapolis, MN || W 10–6 || Highfill (3–0) || Irvine (0–2) || None ||  || 9–0 || –
|- bgcolor="#bbffbb"
| February 29 || vs. Purdue*  ||  || U.S. Bank Stadium • Minneapolis, MN || W 6–0 || Swiney (3–0) || Brooks (2–1) || None ||  || 10–0 || –
|-

|- bgcolor="#bbffbb"
| March 1 || at Minnesota*  ||  || U.S. Bank Stadium • Minneapolis, MN || W 11–7 || Harrison (2–0) || Ireland (0–1) || None || 1,436 || 11–0 || –
|- bgcolor="#bbffbb"
| March 4 || Coastal Carolina* || No. 8 || Doak Field • Raleigh, NC || W 24–7 (7) || Pace (1–0) || Blackwell (0–1) || None || 2,533 || 12–0 || –
|- bgcolor="#ffbbbb"
| March 6 || at Virginia || No. 8 || Davenport Field at Disharoon Park • Charlottesville, VA || L 3–7 || Bales (3–0) || Johnston (0–1) || Schoch (5) || 2,548 || 12–1 || 0–1
|- bgcolor="#bbffbb"
| March 7 || at Virginia || No. 8 || Davenport Field at Disharoon Park • Charlottesville, VA || W 6–2 || Swiney (4–0) || Whitten (0–1) || None || 2,766 || 13–1 || 1–1
|- bgcolor="#ffbbbb"
| March 8 || at Virginia || No. 8 || Davenport Field at Disharoon Park • Charlottesville, VA || L 3–10 || Savino (1–0) || Harrison (2–1) || None || 2,884 || 13–2 || 1–2
|- bgcolor="#ffbbbb"
| March 10 || * || No. 11 || Doak Field • Raleigh, NC || L 8–9 || Bruce (1–0) || Highfill (3–1) || None || 2,302 || 13–3 || 1–2
|- bgcolor="#bbffbb"
| March 11 || * || No. 11 || Doak Field • Raleigh, NC || W 8–7 || Feeney (2–0) || Johnson (1–3) || None || 2,271 || 14–3 || 1–2
|- bgcolor="#bbbbbb"
| March 13 ||  || No. 11 || Doak Field • Raleigh, NC || canceled ||  ||  ||  ||  || – || –
|- bgcolor="#bbbbbb"
| March 14 || Boston College || No. 11 || Doak Field • Raleigh, NC || canceled ||  ||  ||  ||  || – || –
|- bgcolor="#bbbbbb"
| March 15 || Boston College || No. 11 || Doak Field • Raleigh, NC || canceled ||  ||  ||  ||  || – || –
|- bgcolor="#bbbbbb"
| March 18 || vs. South Carolina* ||  || BB&T Ballpark • Charlotte, NC || canceled ||  ||  ||  ||  || – || –
|- bgcolor="#bbbbbb"
| March 20 ||  ||  || Doak Field • Raleigh, NC || canceled ||  ||  ||  ||  || – || –
|- bgcolor="#bbbbbb"
| March 21 || Wake Forest ||  || Doak Field • Raleigh, NC || canceled ||  ||  ||  ||  || – || –
|- bgcolor="#bbbbbb"
| March 22 || Wake Forest ||  || Doak Field • Raleigh, NC || canceled ||  ||  ||  ||  || – || –
|- bgcolor="#bbbbbb"
| March 24 || vs. * ||  || BB&T Ballpark • Charlotte, NC || canceled ||  ||  ||  ||  || – || –
|- bgcolor="#bbbbbb"
| March 27 || at Florida State ||  || Dick Howser Stadium • Tallahassee, FL || canceled ||  ||  ||  ||  || – || –
|- bgcolor="#bbbbbb"
| March 28 || at Florida State ||  || Dick Howser Stadium • Tallahassee, FL || canceled ||  ||  ||  ||  || – || –
|- bgcolor="#bbbbbb"
| March 29 || at Florida State ||  || Dick Howser Stadium • Tallahassee, FL || canceled ||  ||  ||  ||  || – || –
|-

|- bgcolor="#bbbbbb"
| April 1 || * ||  || Doak Field • Raleigh, NC || canceled ||  ||  ||  ||  || – || –
|- bgcolor="#bbbbbb"
| April 3 ||  ||  || Doak Field • Raleigh, NC || canceled ||  ||  ||  ||  || – || –
|- bgcolor="#bbbbbb"
| April 4 || Duke ||  || Doak Field • Raleigh, NC || canceled ||  ||  ||  ||  || – || –
|- bgcolor="#bbbbbb"
| April 5 || Duke ||  || Doak Field • Raleigh, NC || canceled ||  ||  ||  ||  || – || –
|- bgcolor="#bbbbbb"
| April 7 || at * ||  || Jim Perry Stadium • Buies Creek, NC || canceled ||  ||  ||  ||  || – || –
|- bgcolor="#bbbbbb"
| April 10 || at  ||  || Russ Chandler Stadium • Atlanta, GA || canceled ||  ||  ||  ||  || – || –
|- bgcolor="#bbbbbb"
| April 11 || at Georgia Tech||  || Russ Chandler Stadium • Atlanta, GA || canceled ||  ||  ||  ||  || – || –
|- bgcolor="#bbbbbb"
| April 12 || at Georgia Tech||  || Russ Chandler Stadium • Atlanta, GA || canceled ||  ||  ||  ||  || – || –
|- bgcolor="#bbbbbb"
| April 15 || at * ||  || Latham Park • Elon, NC || canceled ||  ||  ||  ||  || – || –
|- bgcolor="#bbbbbb"
| April 17 ||  ||  || Doak Field • Raleigh, NC || canceled ||  ||  ||  ||  || – || –
|- bgcolor="#bbbbbb"
| April 18 || North Carolina ||  || Doak Field • Raleigh, NC || canceled ||  ||  ||  ||  || – || –
|- bgcolor="#bbbbbb"
| April 19 || North Carolina ||  || Doak Field • Raleigh, NC || canceled ||  ||  ||  ||  || – || –
|- bgcolor="#bbbbbb"
| April 21 || Elon* ||  || Doak Field • Raleigh, NC || canceled ||  ||  ||  ||  || – || –
|- bgcolor="#bbbbbb"
| April 24 || at Clemson ||  || Doug Kingsmore Stadium • Clemson, SC || canceled ||  ||  ||  ||  || – || –
|- bgcolor="#bbbbbb"
| April 25 || at Clemson ||  || Doug Kingsmore Stadium • Clemson, SC || canceled ||  ||  ||  ||  || – || –
|- bgcolor="#bbbbbb"
| April 26 || at Clemson ||  || Doug Kingsmore Stadium • Clemson, SC || canceled ||  ||  ||  ||  || – || –
|- bgcolor="#bbbbbb"
| April 29 || Campbell* ||  || Doak Field • Raleigh, NC || canceled ||  ||  ||  ||  || – || –
|-

|- bgcolor="#bbbbbb"
| May 1 || *  ||  || Doak Field • Raleigh, NC || canceled ||  ||  ||  ||  || – || –
|- bgcolor="#bbbbbb"
| May 2 || Austin Peay* ||  || Doak Field • Raleigh, NC || canceled ||  ||  ||  ||  || – || –
|- bgcolor="#bbbbbb"
| May 3 || Austin Peay* ||  || Doak Field • Raleigh, NC || canceled ||  ||  ||  ||  || – || –
|- bgcolor="#bbbbbb"
| May 5 || * ||  || Doak Field • Raleigh, NC || canceled ||  ||  ||  ||  || – || –
|- bgcolor="#bbbbbb"
| May 8 || at Louisville ||  || Jim Patterson Stadium • Louisville, KY || canceled ||  ||  ||  ||  || – || –
|- bgcolor="#bbbbbb"
| May 9 || at Louisville ||  || Jim Patterson Stadium • Louisville, KY || canceled ||  ||  ||  ||  || – || –
|- bgcolor="#bbbbbb"
| May 10 || at Louisville ||  || Jim Patterson Stadium • Louisville, KY || canceled ||  ||  ||  ||  || – || –
|- bgcolor="#bbbbbb"
| May 12 || at UNC–Wilmington ||  || Brooks Field • Wilmington, NC || canceled ||  ||  ||  ||  || – || –
|- bgcolor="#bbbbbb"
| May 14 ||  ||  || Doak Field • Raleigh, NC || canceled ||  ||  ||  ||  || – || –
|- bgcolor="#bbbbbb"
| May 15 || Notre Dame ||  || Doak Field • Raleigh, NC || canceled ||  ||  ||  ||  || – || –
|- bgcolor="#bbbbbb"
| May 16 || Notre Dame ||  || Doak Field • Raleigh, NC || canceled ||  ||  ||  ||  || – || –
|-

|- 
! style="" | Postseason
|-

|- bgcolor="#bbbbbb"
| May 19–24 || vs TBD ||  || BB&T Ballpark • Charlotte, NC || canceled ||  ||  ||  ||  || – || –
|-

|- 
| style="font-size:88%;" | All rankings from D1Baseball.
|-
| Source:

Ranking movements

2020 MLB draft

References

NC State Wolfpack
NC State Wolfpack baseball seasons
NC State Wolfpack